Breweries in the U.S. state of Colorado produce a wide range of beers in different styles that are marketed locally, regionally, nationally, and internationally. In 2012 Colorado's 161 breweries and brewpubs and 3 wholesalers employed 5,000 people directly, and more than 22,000 others in related jobs such as wholesaling and retailing. Including people directly employed in brewing, as well as those who supply Colorado's breweries with everything from ingredients to machinery, the total business and personal tax revenue generated by Colorado's breweries and related industries was more than $2.5 billion. Consumer purchases of Colorado's brewery products generated another $118 million in tax revenue. In 2012, according to the Brewers Association, Colorado ranked 3rd in the number of craft breweries, and 6th per capita with 154.

According to the Beer Institute, the state ranked number one in terms of gross beer production, producing over 23,370,848 barrels in 2006.  Colorado is home to 4 of the top-50 brewing companies in the nation.

For context, at the end of 2013 there were 2,822 breweries in the United States, including 2,768 craft breweries subdivided into 1,237 brewpubs, 1,412 microbreweries and 119 regional craft breweries.  In that same year, according to the Beer Institute, the brewing industry employed around 43,000 Americans in brewing and distribution and had a combined economic impact of more than $246 billion.

Breweries

 3 Freaks Brewery – Highlands Ranch
 300 Suns – Longmont
 Adolph Coors Company – Golden; the largest single brewery in the world, producing up to 22 million barrels of beer each year
 Asher Brewing Company – Boulder
 Avery Brewing Company – Boulder
Beyond The Mountain Brewing- Boulder 
 Black Bottle Brewery – Fort Collins
 Bootstrap Brewing Company  - Longmont
 Boulder Beer Company – Boulder
 Breckenridge Brewery – Littleton; acquired by Anheuser-Busch in 2015
 Brewability - Englewood 
Call to Arms Brewing Company, Denver
 Camber Brewing Company - Fraser
 Cannonball Creek Brewing Company – Golden
 Collision Brewing Company - Longmont
 Crabtree Brewing Company – Greeley
 Declaration Brewing Company – Denver
DeSteeg Brewing, Denver
 Dillon Dam Brewery – Dillon
 Dry Dock Brewing Co. – Aurora
Eddyline Brewery, Salida
Elk Mountain Brewing Company – Parker
Flyeco Craft Brewing - Denver
 Fort Collins Brewery – Fort Collins
 Front Range Brewing Co. - Lafayette
 Great Divide Brewing Company – Denver
 Grossen Bart Brewery - Longmont
Hogshead Brewery - Denver
 Left Hand Brewing Company – Longmont
 Living the Dream Brewing – Littleton – taproom, opened in 2014
Little Machine Beer, Denver
 Locavore Beer Works – Littleton – taproom, opened in 2014
 Mad Jack's Mountain Brewery – Bailey taproom, opened in 2016
Mountain Toad Brewing - Golden
 New Belgium Brewing – Fort Collins; the first wind-powered brewery in the U.S. and is currently the largest of its kind in the world
Oasis Brewing Company, Denver
 Odell Brewing Company – Fort Collins
 Oskar Blues Brewery – Lyons and Longmont
 Paonia United Brewing Company – Paonia
 Paradox Beer Company – Divide
 The Post Brewing Company – Lafayette
Seestock Brewery, Denver
 Rails End Beer Company - Broomfield
 Ska Brewing – Durango
South Park Brewing, Fairplay
 Snowbank Brewing –  Fort Collins
Three Barrel Brewing Co, Del Norte
 Tommyknocker Brewery – Idaho Springs
 Upslope Brewing Company – Boulder
 Walnut Brewery – Boulder
WestFax Brewing Company, Denver
 Wibby Brewing - Longmont
 Wiley Roots Brewing Company – Greeley
 Wonderland Brewing - Broomfield
 Wynkoop Brewing Company – Denver

Pop culture
In Dumb and Dumber, Lloyd refers to Aspen, Colorado as "a place where the beer flows like wine".

Denver has been nicknamed "the Napa valley of beer," but it is unclear how this nickname came to be. Referenced by the Denver Business Journal, it's rumored that the nickname was created by the Sheraton Hotel chain as part of their "Chief Beer Officer" promotion in 2008.

According to legend, Denver's first permanent structure was a saloon. While there is evidence of a saloon and brothel at 2009 Market Street of historical significance, it seems likely that the true location of the first permanent structure is forever unknown. According to The City and The Saloon, Denver 1858-1916, there were numerous saloons in the Denver area during the city's early days.

See also
 Beer in the United States
 List of breweries in the United States
 List of microbreweries

References

External links
Colorado Brewery List
Colorado Breweries Directory
Colorado Breweries
Boulder, Colorado Craft Brewery Guide

Colorado
Breweries